Garmo Stave Church is a stave church situated at the Maihaugen museum at Lillehammer in Innlandet, Norway. Garmo Stave Church at Maihaugen is one of the most visited stave churches in Norway.

Description 
Garmo Stave Church originally came from the village of Garmo in Lom in the former Oppland county. It was built circa 1150 on the site of a previous church believed to have been built in 1021 by a Viking chieftain.   In 1730, it was expanded into a cruciform church in the timber.

After Garmo Church (Garmo kyrkje) was built as the new parish church in 1879, the stave church was demolished and the materials sold at auction. In 1882, the church was sold to Anders Sandvig, who brought it to Lillehammer in sections. It was re-erected at Maihaugen in 1920–1921. It is unclear how much of the original materials were used in the reconstruction.  The church consists largely of 17th and 18th century inventory. Apart from the claystone baptismal font from the 1100s, all the furnishings in the Garmo Stave Church come from other churches. The pulpit made in 1738 came from Romsdalen. The altarpiece from 1695 came from Lillehammer.

Gallery

See also 
 The Parson's Widow

References

Further reading 
 Leif Anker (2005) The Norwegian Stave Churches (Oslo: Arfo Forlag) 
 Roar Hauglid (1970) Norwegian Stave Churches (Oslo: Dreyers Forlag)

External links 

 Garmo Stave Church in Stavkirke.org 

12th-century churches in Norway
Stave churches in Norway
Buildings and structures in Lillehammer
Churches in Innlandet
Churches completed in 1150